Lago Verde may refer to:

 Lago Verde, Chile, a commune in Chile
 Lago Verde, Maranhão, a town in the Brazilian state of Maranhão
 Lago Verde (Queyras), a lake in Italy
 Grünsee (Pflersch) (Italian: Lago Verde), in the Pflersch Valley in the Stubai Alps, Italy

See also
Laguna Verde (disambiguation)
Green Lake (disambiguation)